František Jursa (1 May 1933 – 28 December 2022) was a Czech cyclist. He competed at the 1956 Summer Olympics in the individual and team road races and in the 4000 m team pursuit; he finished in fifth place in the last event. In 1960 he won the Košice-Tatry-Košice race.

References 

1933 births
2022 deaths
Olympic cyclists of Czechoslovakia
Cyclists at the 1956 Summer Olympics
Czech male cyclists
Sportspeople from Brno
Czechoslovak male cyclists